Penck is a surname. Notable people with the surname include: 

A. R. Penck (1939–2017), German painter, sculptor and printmaker
Albrecht Penck (1858–1945), German geographer and geologist
Walther Penck (1888–1923), German geomorphologist, son of Albrecht

See also
 Peng (surname)
 Pang (surname)